Mercy High School is a Roman Catholic college preparatory high school for girls in Farmington Hills, Michigan.

The Sisters of Mercy opened Our Lady of Mercy High School in Detroit in 1945. The school moved to Farmington Hills in 1965.

Notable alumnae
 Diane Dietz, basketball player and chief marketing officer of Cranbrook Educational Community
 Heidi Ewing, documentary filmmaker
 Nicole Gibbons, interior designer and television personality
 Lauren Lake, talk show host
 Meg Mallon, professional golfer
 Mozella, singer/songwriter; co-writer of hit song "Wrecking Ball"

External links

 School Website
 Admissions
 Alumnae
 Mercy Life
 Curriculum
 Spiritual Life

Notes and references

Roman Catholic Archdiocese of Detroit
Catholic secondary schools in Michigan
Schools in Farmington Hills, Michigan
Educational institutions established in 1945
Girls' schools in Michigan
High schools in Oakland County, Michigan
1945 establishments in Michigan
Sisters of Mercy schools